ICWS may refer to:

 Institute of Commonwealth Studies, University of London, UK
 International College Wales Swansea (ICWS) - Swansea University, UK
 International Conference on Web Services
 International Core War Society